Nir (also Romanized as Nīr; also, Nīleh) is a city in, and the capital of, Nir District of Taft County, Yazd province, Iran. At the 2006 census, its population was 1,567 in 503 households. The following census in 2011 counted 1,620 people in 501 households. The latest census in 2016 showed a population of 1,740 people in 606 households.

References 

Taft County

Cities in Yazd Province

Populated places in Yazd Province

Populated places in Taft County